Chinese publishing and printing industry have a long history. The first printed book (in paper) discovered so far in the world was published in China during Tang dynasty (7th century). The Chinese publishing industry continues to grow in modern times. In 2004, China published 25.77 billion copies of national-level and provincial-level newspapers, 2.69 billion magazines, and 6.44 billion books .

Overview

Since China began incorporation of its publishing industry in 2002, 55 publishing groups have been set up. The largest,  (CPG) (in ), established in April 2003, incorporates 12 large enterprises and institutes including The Commercial Press, the Zhonghua Book Company, the DSX Book Company, and the main store of the Xinhua Bookstore, China International Publishing Trade Corporation, and China Book Import and Export (Group) Corporation. According to a national plan, by the end of 2005 China will have 5-10 publishing groups with annual sales of between ¥1 billion and ¥10 billion; 10-20 periodicals with worldwide distribution, and 1-2 periodical groups with annual sales of ¥300 million to ¥500 million.

Meanwhile, in accordance with China's undertakings to WTO, the State Press and Publication Administration of China issued the Administrative Measures on Foreign-Invested Book, Newspaper and Periodical Distribution Enterprises in May 2003. This allowed foreign investors to engage in book, newspaper and periodical retailing as of May 1, 2003, and wholesaling as of December 1, 2004, and stipulating that foreign investors must have the approval of the State Press and Publication Administration to establish book, newspaper and periodical retailing and wholesaling enterprises. At present, more than 60 foreign-invested enterprises have set up agencies in mainland China, preparing to apply for or in the process of applying for investment in and the establishment of book, newspaper and periodical distribution enterprises.

History

Timeline
 ~250 BCE - Writing on silk begins; previously writing on bamboo was the usual method.
 ~150 BCE - Hemp papermaking begins.
 868 CE - Block-printed Buddhist Diamond Sutra published.
 1041 CE - Book printing from moveable type begins.
 1964 - Quotations from Chairman Mao Tse-tung (Little Red Book) first issued. During the 1960s, the book was the single most visible icon in mainland China.

Books and periodicals
The Chinese book industry is the second largest in the world, after the United States. Receipts in 2013 totalled $8 billion from 400,000 titles.

As of 2015, there were about 580 state-controlled publishing houses and 292 audio-video publishers in China. The state has also planned key book publication projects and established prizes for books, promoting the development of the publishing industry.

In 1949, there were only 257 periodicals in China, with a total impression of 20 million, or less than 0.1 copy per capita. In 1979, after the reform and opening-up, the number of periodicals rose to 1,470, with a total of 1.184 billion copies, or 1 copy per capita. In 2004, there were more than 8,000 periodicals in China, with a total impression of 2.69 billion, or more than 2.1 copies per person .

Along with the speeding up of the information industry, the electronic publications market produces over 2,000 electronic publications, annually.

Foreign-language publishing

The China International Publishing Group (CIPG, in ) undertakes the publication, printing and distribution of foreign-language books and periodicals, playing a unique role in publishing, cultural exchange and cooperation. It consists of four print magazines and several websites in many languages including English, French, Spanish, Arabic, Japanese, Esperanto and Chinese.

The four magazines are Beijing Review, China Today, China Pictorial, and People's China. It also has seven publishing houses, including Foreign Languages Press and New World Press, publishing nearly 1,000 titles annually, covering a wide range of subjects in more than 20 foreign languages. The books are distributed to some 190 countries and regions, presenting China to all countries and promoting cultural exchange. The China International Book Trading Corporation, a member of the CIPG, distributes foreign-language books and periodicals to 80-odd countries and regions, and holds exhibition of Chinese books abroad.

The Intercontinental Communications Center

This is a non-governmental international communications organization specializing in producing multi-language audio-video products (including films and television programs) and regular publications. Since it was founded in 1993, it has turned out several hundred hours of movies and television programs and about a hundred books every year, which reach well over 150 countries and regions across the world. These programs and books mainly introduce to the world China's society, culture, customs, reform and opening-up, and modernization drive, as well as China's views on issues of international concern.

The China Internet Information Center
This center went into operation on January 1, 1997, utilizing Internet technology to introduce the most authoritative and comprehensive information about China to people at home and abroad. Over 91 percent of its readership is overseas ..

Scientific publishing

Digital publishing
Digital publishing is emerging as a new economic growth point for the country's publishing industry, with China's digital publishing industry is predicted to continue posting annual revenue growth rates of about 50 percent in the next few years. The General Administration of Press and Publication (GAPP), predicted the revenue of the digital publishing sector to exceed ¥75 billion ($10.98 billion) in 2009.  Industry revenue in 2008 hit ¥53 billion, up 46 percent year-on-year, the administration's figures showed.

The digital publishing industry include the digitalization of traditional publishing products, such as newspapers, books and cell phone text messages, and new digital media. It is estimated a 30 percent annual growth in the number of digital publishing products users in the next few years with the growing popularity of digital technology. About 90 percent of China's 578 publishing houses have digital products. In a national survey of about 40 newspapers, 30 have their online edition and 22 have mobile newspapers sent via cell phone messages.

See also
 Media of China
Chinese literature
Xinhua Bookstore
Cathay Book Store
 Legal deposit: China
 China Printing Museum in Beijing
 Chinese Dictionary Museum in Shanxi

References

Bibliography

External links
China Internet Information Center
China Publishing Group (in Chinese)
China International Publishing Group (CIPG) (in Chinese and English)
  (list of Chinese printed publications published in China since 1911)

Mass media in China
Publishing in China